Goring is an English surname (not to be confused with the German surname Göring). Notable people with this surname include the following:

 Goring baronets, a noble family in the baronetage of England
 Alison Goring (born 1963), Canadian curler
 Butch Goring (born 1949), retired Canadian hockey player 
 Charles Goring, 2nd Earl of Norwich (1615–1671)
 Charles Buckman Goring (1870–1919), English criminologist
 George Goring, 1st Earl of Norwich (1585–1663)
 George Goring, Lord Goring (1608–1657), English Civil War general
 Henry Goring and Harry Goring, several people
 Marius Goring (1912–1998), English actor
 Peter Goring (1927–1994), English footballer
 Trevor Goring (born 1949), English visual artist
 Trevor Goring (comics), English comic book and storyboard artist
 William Goring (disambiguation), several people

See also
Arthur Goring Thomas, English composer

English-language surnames